"Masterpiece" is a song by American rapper DaBaby. It was released via South Coast Music Group/Interscope Records as the lead single from his upcoming fourth studio album on January 15, 2021. Serving as his first release of the year, he wrote it with its producer D.A. Got That Dope, along with Christopher Torpey and Justin Vibes.

Background and composition
DaBaby previewed the track on Instagram in December 2020.  In the song, DaBaby references his relationship with DaniLeigh and his involvement in the November 2018 shooting incident in which he pleaded self-defense; the charges were later dropped.

Music video
The music video, directed by Gemini Visions, was released alongside the single on January 15, 2021.  The visual sees DaBaby surrounded by sports cars, private jets, and fans, while wearing all Gucci.  DaBaby's then-girlfriend DaniLeigh also appears in the video. As of April 2021 the video has over 20 million views.

Personnel
Credits adapted from Tidal.
 DaBaby – songwriting, vocals, lyrics
 D.A. Got That Dope – songwriting, lyrics, production
 Christopher Torpey – songwriting, synthesizer 
 Justin Thomas – songwriting, lyrics
 Curtis "Sircuit" Bye – assistant mixing
 Jacob Bryant – assistant mixing
 Nicolas De Porcel – mastering engineer
 Derek "MixedByAli" Ali – mixing
 Javaun Mundle – recording engineer

Charts

Weekly charts

Year-end charts

Certifications

Release history

References

2021 singles
2021 songs
DaBaby songs
Songs written by DaBaby
Songs written by D.A. Got That Dope
Interscope Records singles